Kandireega is a 2011 Indian Telugu-language romantic comedy action film directed by Santosh Srinivas and produced by Bellamkonda Suresh under Sri Sai Ganesh Productions. The film stars Ram Pothineni, Hansika Motwani, Sonu Sood and Aksha Pardasany with the music scored by S. Thaman. Released on 12 August 2011, the film was a commercial success, grossing 22 crore at the box office. The film was commercially successful, becoming one of the highest grossing Telugu films of that year.

It was remade in Bengali as Paglu 2 (2012) and in Hindi as Main Tera Hero (2014). Five years later it was dubbed in Hindi as Dangerous Khiladi 4.

Plot
Sreenu is the son of Vishwanatham. He is a high school dropout in Anakapalle and wants to marry his uncle's daughter Bujji. She rejects him, stating that he doesn’t have a basic college education. Sreenu, who is clever and street-smart, decides to go to Hyderabad for further education. While traveling on the train, he bashes up a bunch of rowdies teasing college girls. At the college in Hyderabad, he meets Shruthi and falls in love with her. The city gangster Bhavani is in love with her and blackmails her into marrying him. He beats anyone moving closely with Shruthi. Meanwhile, henchmen of Rajanna, a dreaded chieftain from Warangal, are looking for Sreenu in the city.

Sreenu meets Bhavani and forces him to a challenge, whereby, he will make Shruthi love him. Sreenu rescues Shruthi from being kidnapped by the gang of Yadayya, a rival of Bhavani. When Sreenu wins Shruthi's heart, and both of them decide to elope, she is kidnapped.

It is then revealed that Rajanna kidnapped Shruthi to get hold of Sreenu because Rajanna's daughter Sandhya is in love with Sreenu. She was on the train during the night and gets impressed by him. Sreenu lands at Rajanna's place and finds himself in a fix. Bhavani, too, arrives at Rajanna's place to take away Shruthi. A police intelligence officer, Avataram, Rajanna's brother-in-law, comes to attend Sreenu and Sandhya's wedding. Sreenu and Bhavani start their one-upmanship games to win Shruthi.

How Sreenu comes out of this quagmire to rescue Shruthi from the clutches of Rajanna and Bhavani and what happens to Sandhya are revealed in the climax interspersed with twists and turns.

Cast

 Ram as Sreenu 
Hansika Motwani as Shruthi
 Sonu Sood as Bhavani
 Aksha Pardasany as Sandhya 
 Chandra Mohan as Vishwanatham, Sreenu's father
 Jaya Prakash Reddy as Rajanna, Sandhya's father
 M. S. Narayana as Sreenu's uncle
 Dharmavarapu Subramanyam as Sreenu's uncle
 Srinivasa Reddy as Sreenu's friend
 Raghu Babu as Intelligence Officer Avataram
 Saptagiri as Giri
 Fish Venkat as Chintu
 Y. Kasi Viswanath as Sruthi's father
 Pragathi
 Rama Prabha
 Hema
 Brahmaji 
 Praveen
 Brahmanandam (cameo appearance)
 Swati Reddy as Bujji (guest appearance)

Production
This film was initially announced in October 2009 with Ravi Teja playing the lead role and with Krishna Vamsi as director, with the producer announcing the film as a partly fantasy venture. The film progressed in pre-production with Tamannaah Bhatia and Sneha Ullal being considered to portray the heroine role, whilst the fantasy elements in the original script were removed. In April 2010, it was revealed that the producer and Ravi Teja had fallen out and he was replaced by Ram. Thetfilming began in October 2010 with Ram and Hansika Motwani, whilst actress Swati Reddy shot scenes the following month. Ram stated on his Twitter account that the film had three female lead roles, and suggested that Nisha Aggarwal was signed on.

During the first schedule, events on the set of the film became the reason for the Telugu film industry strikes of 2010 after Telugu film fighters attacked Tamil film technicians in Chennai on the sets of the film in December 2009. Enraged by this, producers called for a bandh the next day. However, film workers declared a strike immediately after that for an indefinite period. The crisis affected the whole film industry and no films were shot in Andhra Pradesh during late December and early January during negotiations.

After filming had resumed, the original music director Chakri was replaced by S. Thaman in March 2011.

Soundtrack

Kandireegas audio was launched at Taj Deccan in Hyderabad on 14 July 2011. Venkatesh was the chief guest at the audio launch. Dharmavarapu Subramaniam, hero Gopichand, producer Bellamkonda Suresh, director of the film Santosh Srinivas, senior director V. V. Vinayak, music composer S. S. Thaman, actress Aksha, Sravanti Ravikishore etc. all were present at the grand audio launch.

Release
The film was theatrically released on 12 August 2011.

Home media 
In a bid to acquire the film, Gemini TV was competing but the rights were acquired by Zee Telugu.

Reception 
Jeevi of Idlebrain rated the film 3 out of 5 and stated that "Kandireega is a kind of script that is prepared to cater to comedy and mass elements. It is a mass masala movie with ample entertainment". Echoing the same, The Times of India stated: "Though the story isn’t too original, Kandireega is an out-and-out entertainer that doesn’t leave you bored for even a second".

Remake
The film was remade in Hindi as Main Tera Hero, and in Bengali as Paglu 2.

References

External links

2010s Telugu-language films
2011 romantic comedy films
2011 films
Telugu films remade in other languages
Films shot in Warangal
Films shot in Tamil Nadu
Indian action comedy films
Indian romantic comedy films
Films scored by Thaman S
2010s romantic action films
Indian romantic action films
2011 action comedy films
Films set in Hyderabad, India
Films set in Telangana
Films set in Andhra Pradesh
Films directed by Santosh Srinivas